The Dacia Lodgy was a compact MPV which was unveiled jointly by the French manufacturer Renault and its Romanian subsidiary Dacia, officially launched at the 2012 Geneva Motor Show.

Overview

Based on a new platform, the Lodgy is front-wheel drive and powered by a choice of four cylinder engines: a 1.5 L diesel (in two variants) and two petrol engines, a 1.6 L aspirated and a 1.2 L turbocharged Energy TCe 115.

Lodgy is the first Dacia model to offer a speed limiter, on the Laureate level, and a navigation system with a seven-inch touchscreen display, as an option. Bluetooth and USB connectivity, previously introduced on the Dacia Duster, are also available.

The car was available only in LHD from launch, and with a choice of five and seven seater models. It is manufactured at an all new Renault factory in Tangier, Morocco.

The Lodgy received three stars in Euro NCAP's crash test rating, considered to be the lowest result for a car in 2012. In the test, the rear passenger floor panel and tunnel were completely separated, and the transmission tunnel was deformed between the front seats.

India
Renault India launched its MPV Lodgy on 9 April 2015, at a base price Rs 8.19 lac. The Lodgy is offered in seven variants, namely: Lodgy std 85PS, Lodgy RxE 85PS, Lodgy RxL 85PS, Lodgy RxZ 85PS, Lodgy RxL 110PS, Lodgy RxZ 110PS 8 seater and Lodgy RxZ 110PS seven seater.

Its major exterior features includes twin slated grill, swept back headlamps, fog lamps, chrome highlights, contemporary taillight cluster, while major interior highlights are spacious cabin, large windows, seven and eight seater option, newly designed dashboard, touch screen infotainment system, comfortable seats and multi function steering wheel with cruise control toggles.
It was discontinued in India in the year 2020.

Engines

Lodgy Glace

In November 2011, Dacia announced that it would take part in the Andros Trophy, revealing the new Lodgy for the first time, in an ice racing version called Lodgy Glace.

Two models were raced by father and son Alain Prost and Nicolas Prost, and the third by Evens Stievenart. The team eventually won the competition, with Alain Prost as the first placed driver, gaining four victories and six other podium finishes.

The seven rounds took place in Val Thorens, Andorra, Alpe d'Huez, Isola 2000, Lans-en-Vercors, Saint-Dié-des-Vosges and Super Besse. It was the first MPV model to win the competition, and the second model from Dacia to compete in the Andros Trophy, after the Duster took part in the seasons of 2010 and 2011.

Safety 
The Lodgy for India with no airbags and no ABS received 0 stars for adult occupants and 2 stars for toddlers from Global NCAP in 2018 (similar to Latin NCAP 2013).

References

External links

Official Dacia Lodgy website
Renault Lodgy Stepway
Owner's Manual

Lodgy
Cars of Romania
Front-wheel-drive vehicles
Compact MPVs
Global NCAP small MPVs
2010s cars
Cars introduced in 2012